Sylvanès is a commune in the Aveyron department in southern France.

Geography
The Dourdou de Camarès forms part of the commune's southern border.

Population

See also
Communes of the Aveyron department

References

External links

Official Web site
Aveyron Tourist Board

Communes of Aveyron
Aveyron communes articles needing translation from French Wikipedia